Hernane Vidal de Souza (born 4 August 1986), simply known as Hernane, is a Brazilian footballer who plays for Brasiliense FC as a striker.

Career
Born in Bom Jesus da Lapa, Hernane began his career in SC Atibaia's youth categories, but later moved to São Paulo FC. However, he failed to make his breakthrough in first team, and was subsequently loaned to smaller clubs. In June 2010 he went on a trial at Swedish club Malmö FF.

In August 2011, Hernane left São Paulo and joined Paraná Clube. He scored against Salgueiro AC and AD São Caetano. In November, he agreed to join Mogi Mirim EC in January 2012. In 2012 Campeonato Paulista, he scored sixteen goals in twenty-two games, being the club's topscorer, and being the championship second topscorer, only behind Neymar. He was also selected in the top XI of the competition.

Flamengo
In June 2012, Hernane joined Flamengo, which bought 10% of his rights from Mogi Mirim, with an option to buy more 40%. He made his debut on 9 June, against Coritiba, getting on the scoresheet.

Career statistics

Honours
Mogi Mirim
Campeonato Paulista do Interior: 2012

Flamengo
Copa do Brasil: 2013
Campeonato Carioca: 2014

Bahia
Copa do Nordeste: 2017

Grêmio
Campeonato Gaúcho: 2018

Individual
Best Forward of Campeonato Paulista: 2012

References

External links
 Article about loan at Toledo Colonia Work 
 

1986 births
Living people
Brazilian footballers
Association football forwards
Campeonato Brasileiro Série A players
Campeonato Brasileiro Série B players
São Paulo FC players
Paulista Futebol Clube players
Paraná Clube players
Mogi Mirim Esporte Clube players
CR Flamengo footballers
Sport Club do Recife players
Esporte Clube Bahia players
Grêmio Foot-Ball Porto Alegrense players
Al Nassr FC players
Brazilian expatriate footballers
Brazilian expatriate sportspeople in Saudi Arabia
Expatriate footballers in Saudi Arabia
Saudi Professional League players